Antonina Rubtsova (born ) is a Kazakhstani female volleyball player. She was part of the Kazakhstan women's national volleyball team.

She participated in the 2011 FIVB Volleyball World Grand Prix.
On club level she played for Irtysh Kazchrome in 2011.

References

External links
 Profile at FIVB.org

1984 births
Living people
Kazakhstani women's volleyball players
Place of birth missing (living people)